Savages is a 2012 American crime thriller film directed by Oliver Stone. It is based on Don Winslow's novel of the same name. The screenplay was written by Shane Salerno, Stone, and Winslow. The film was released on July 6, 2012 to mixed reviews and grossed $83 million worldwide. It stars Taylor Kitsch, Blake Lively, Aaron Taylor-Johnson, Benicio del Toro, Demián Bichir, Salma Hayek, Emile Hirsch and John Travolta.

Plot
Best friends Chon and Ben are marijuana growers in Laguna Beach. Chon, a former Navy SEAL, smuggled the seeds for the plants out of Afghanistan. Ben, a University of California, Berkeley graduate in business and botany, cultivates marijuana. The seeds yield a particularly potent strain, which develops a wide customer base. Chon and Ben become wealthy, and Ben devotes time and money to charity work in Africa and Asia. They are both openly in a relationship with Ophelia Sage.

The trio receives a video from Mexican drug-cartel enforcer Miguel "Lado" Arroyo of severed heads and a chainsaw, and Arroyo demands a meeting at which the cartel offers a partnership. Although Chon and Ben offer to hand over their network and get out of the business, the cartel wants their expertise and insists on a partnership. Chon and Ben make plans with Ophelia to go to Indonesia for a year, not telling her that they are fleeing the cartel. They speak to corrupt DEA agent Dennis Cain, who is on the take from them and who urges them to join the cartel. Ophelia is kidnapped by Lado's gang; Chon and Ben are notified of the kidnapping by a video call from cartel leader Elena Sánchez, who threatens to harm Ophelia if they decline the partnership.

They discuss the situation with Dennis, who tells them that Elena is facing the loss of her political connections in Mexico (foiling her efforts to move into the U.S.). Since she has already lost most of her family, Dennis says that he has nothing on her that can help them. Chon stabs Dennis in the hand and demands DEA intelligence so they can attack Elena. With help from Chon's Navy SEAL friends, he and Ben attack a cartel money convoy and kill seven of Elena's men.

Ophelia, held in horrible conditions, demands to speak to whoever is in charge. Lado drugs and rapes her in retaliation for going over his head. Elena, traveling to the U.S. to visit her daughter and deal with the escalating situation, has Ophelia brought with her. Chon and Ben frame high-ranking cartel member Alex as an agent of Elena's rival, El Azul. With Dennis' help, they falsify evidence and give it to Lado. Lado tortures Alex to force a confession. After Alex confesses, Lado covers him with petrol and forces Ben to ignite the petrol; Ophelia is forced to watch. Lado double-crosses Elena and begins working with El Azul.

Ben and Chon pay Dennis $3 million for information about Elena's daughter, Magda, and the name of his informant in Elena's cartel. They kidnap Magda and video-call Elena to establish that they are now in control. With Elena at their mercy, they arrange a desert meeting to exchange Ophelia and Magda at which snipers from both sides are in position. Elena asks who revealed her daughter's location, and Chon tells her it was Lado. She tries to kill Lado, but he shoots her first. A firefight erupts, and Chon is shot several times. Lado is shot in the back by Ben, but shoots him in the neck before Ophelia kills him. Ben is mortally wounded, and Chon injects him, Ophelia, and himself with a fatal overdose so they can die together.

Ophelia wakes from a nightmare. At the meeting, Lado steals Elena's car and escapes as Dennis leads DEA agents to the scene. Everyone but Lado and Magda is arrested. Because Ben has incriminating information about Dennis, Dennis identifies Ben and Chon as his informants in the cartel and they are released. Elena is sentenced to thirty years in prison, and El Azul and Lado create a new cartel called the Azulados. Ben, Chon, and Ophelia leave the country and live in a beachside hut, possibly in Indonesia. Ophelia tells us that they are living like savages.

Cast
 Taylor Kitsch as John "Chon" McAllister Jr. 
 Blake Lively as Ophelia "O" Sage
 Aaron Taylor-Johnson as Ben Leonard
 Benicio del Toro as Miguel "Lado" Arroyo
 John Travolta as DEA Agent Dennis Cain
 Salma Hayek as Elena "La Reina" Sánchez
 Demián Bichir as Alex Reyes
 Sandra Echeverría as Magdalena Sánchez
 Emile Hirsch as "Spin"
 Joaquín Cosío as "El Azul"
 Mía Maestro as Dolores Arroyo
 Shea Whigham as Chad
 Joel David Moore as Craig
 Amber Dixon as Sophía
 Diego Cataño as Estéban
 Leonard Roberts as Frankie
 Trevor Donovan as Matt
 Ralph Echemendia as Wiley
 Jake McLaughlin as "Doc"
 Alexander Wraith as Sam
 Antonio Jaramillo as Jaime
 Leana Chavez as Gloria
 Elena Varela as Maria
 Lexi Jourden as Hannah 
 Sean Stone as Eric
 Ali Wong as Claire

Production

By August 2011, the film was shooting in the Pacific Palisades neighborhood of Los Angeles. The Los Angeles Times reported: "The estate's indoor pool was converted into a massive hydroponic marijuana farm for the film's production, with about 300 high-octane pot plants jamming the covert nursery." Production designer Tomas Voth said: "I wanted to use real plants and had them all ready to go, but it was some legal thing. Universal told us to use fakes." The sex scenes were filmed during the first three days. The film entered post-production in October 2011. Stone personally categorized it as a romantic action thriller.

Casting
Jennifer Lawrence was originally cast as Ophelia but dropped out due to scheduling conflicts. Other actresses considered to replace Lawrence included Amber Heard, Olivia Wilde, Lindsay Lohan, Teresa Palmer, and Abbie Cornish. In April 2011, it was reported that Blake Lively had been cast as Ophelia. Before casting Taylor Kitsch in the film, Oliver Stone asked director Peter Berg to show him 30 minutes of Kitsch's work in Battleship to see how he was as a leading man, and after seeing that footage, he cast him. Trevor Donovan originally auditioned for a role that was cut but after seeing Donovan's tape, Stone specifically wrote him a part that was not in the book. Uma Thurman played Ophelia's mother, Paqu, but her scenes were cut due to time constraints.

Release
The film was released on July 6, 2012. On its opening weekend, the film ranked fourth at the box-office, earning $16.2 million. As of April 3, 2013, it has grossed $47,382,068 in North America and $35,584,084 in other countries, for a worldwide total of $82,966,152.

Home media
Savages was released on DVD and Blu-ray on November 13, 2012.
(extended version 142 min)

Reception

Critical reception

Savages received mixed reviews from critics. Based on 195 reviews collected by aggregate site Rotten Tomatoes, the film scored a 50% approval rating, with an average rating of 5.80/10. The site's critical consensus is, "It's undeniably messy, but Savages finds Oliver Stone returning to dark, fearlessly lurid form." Metacritic, another review aggregator which assigns a weighted mean rating in the 0–100 range based on reviews from top mainstream critics, calculated an average score of 59, based on 41 reviews, which indicates "mixed or average reviews". Audiences surveyed by CinemaScore gave the film a grade "C+" on scale of A+ to F.

The film was somewhat better received in Europe. UK film and music journalist Dylan B Jones praised it, claiming director Oliver Stone had found "a magic strain of sultry sex, frantically emotional turmoil and glossily savvy action sequences".

Roger Ebert of the Chicago Sun-Times gave the film three and a half stars (out of four) and praised Oliver Stone's direction, saying, "Much of the fascination of 'Savages' comes through Stone's treatment of the negotiations, which involve percentages, sliding scales over three years, an ultimate payout, and other financial details that drugs have in common with big business. It's spellbinding to watch the two sides trying to outthink each other."

HitFix's film critic Drew McWeeny gave the film an A- and called it "one of the most complete pleasures for me this summer". He was in general positive of the actors' performances; he described Lively's work as "smart and sad precisely because she plays O as such a broken, needy little soul" and praised the bond between Kitsch and Taylor-Johnson which "seems not only credible but lived in and authentic throughout the film." In comparison, MovieFix's film critic Connor Jason gave the film 2/5, noting that "Savages is a hot mess – beautiful actors and locations mixed with a plot that starts strong but ultimately turns into a snooze-fest. With a lead villain seemingly ripped from the cover of Cosmo magazine, Stone's latest flick savagely disappoints."

The film was nominated at the 2012 ALMA Awards in four categories including "Favorite Movie Actor", "Favorite Movie Actress—Drama/Adventure", "Favorite Movie Actor—Supporting Role", and "Favorite Movie Actress—Supporting Role" for Benicio Del Toro, Salma Hayek, Demián Bichir and Mia Maestro, respectively.

According to InSight Crime, the assertions used to promote the movie "are not only false, but promote a dangerously misleading view of the country's criminal groups." According to the article, in a televised interview Oliver Stone made a series of unfounded and false assertions to justify his opposition to the War on Drugs, fueling a "dystopian narrative of Mexico" and feeding on the belief that the Mexican criminals are "invincible supermen."

References

External links
 
 
 
 
 Soundtrack-movie.com Savages soundtrack link

2012 films
2012 action thriller films
2012 crime thriller films
American action drama films
American action thriller films
American crime action films
American crime drama films
American crime thriller films
Films about kidnapping
Films about Mexican drug cartels
Films about threesomes
Films based on American crime novels
Films directed by Oliver Stone
Films set in California
Films set in Mexico
Films shot in Indonesia
Films with screenplays by Oliver Stone
Relativity Media films
Universal Pictures films
2010s English-language films
2010s American films
2010s Mexican films